The term Elder, or its equivalent in another language, is used in several countries and organizations to indicate a position of authority. This usage is usually derived from the notion that the oldest members of any given group are the wisest, and are thus the most qualified to rule, provide counsel or serve the said group in some other capacity.

Elder systems
Elder is a role played in the organised community that is most common in tribal subsistence cultures, Elderhood being the condition or quality of being an elder. It is essentially the state of being in the latter portion of one's life and being looked to for leadership of either a passive or active nature by your peers and\or subordinates due almost exclusively to this fact. Sometimes it involves a ceremonial investiture of some kind, and other times it does not. Sometimes it involves a definite chronological milestone which must be surpassed, while at other times the required age is simply relative to the ages of all of the other members of the group in question. Once having met the peculiar requirements of their individual groups, however, all elders are generally expected to mentor, share their experience, create a sense of oneness for their followings and, most especially, act as the spiritual embodiments of their communities.

Informal elderhoods
An example of informal elderhood is the role of the matriarchal grandmother as it appears in many parts of the global South. In the absence of viable male alternatives or even in the presence of them, grandmothers in these areas tend to serve as both the de facto heads of their groups of descendants and the catalysts of their periodic reunions and meetings. By doing so they provide their families with a cohesion that would probably be absent if they weren't present.  Another example is that of the vocational mentor who guides his or her apprentices with tools of sponsorship, advocacy and the demonstration of skills. He or she serves to facilitate creativity in his or her charges by teaching the methods of the past as they pertain to their various  occupations.

Formal elderhoods
In more formal examples of elderhood, elders serve as the members of the governing and/or advisory bodies of higher personages such as kings and presidents in the form of a council of elders. This often gives them a prestige amongst their peoples that's comparable to that of the classical nobility of ancient Europe. Due to this, elderhood of this variety is generally considered to be something worthy of aspiring to in the communities where it exists.

Elders in online communities
There are long established conceptualisations of elders on the Internet. In such online communities elders are typically thought of as established members who are outbound, often due to unwanted changes they can't prevent.

Titles in different cultures
 Alderman in systems with Anglo-Saxon origins is synonymous with what in other systems might be known as a city councilman. It derives from the term ealdorman, meaning "elder man".
 American Indian elder
 Aqsaqal, "white beard" in Turkic languages.
 Auncient, deriving from the Norman French noun ancien, signifying "an elder", has a restricted use in English ceremonial orders of precedence, especially in the legal profession.
Australian Aboriginal elders are widely respected men and women of authority who have a deep knowledge of traditional lore. They are consulted on any important aspect of Aboriginal life.
 Gerousia was the Spartan equivalent of a council. The term means Council of Elders.
 Hor Chan, from Mayan language, meaning "Chief of Chan". Chan was a term some Maya used to refer to themselves.
 Kaumatua are the tribal elders in Māori society.
Oday is the term for elder in the Somali language. Elders hold an important position in Somali society, particularly within the Somali customary law or Xeer, where they serve as judges.
 Oloye is the title of an elder of aristocratic rank amongst the Yoruba people of West Africa, though they usually translate it as chieftain.
 Senator: in the Senate of Rome, the senators were men. Senator comes from the Latin root sen- "old" (senex "old man", compare "senior"), and the senators were actually called patres (fathers).
 Seniūnas, the ruler of Eldership, (seniūnija in Lithuanian), Lithuania's smallest administrative division.
 Sheikh means "old man" in Arabic. The word has specific cultural and religious connotations as well.
 Starosta, derived from Slavic word stary (old), is a title for an official or unofficial position of leadership that has been used in various contexts through most of Slavic history (see also Starets).
 Vanem, ancient ruler of an Estonian parish and county. From 1920–1937, Estonian head of state and head of government was called Riigivanem, meaning "State Elder". Today, county governors are called maavanem and parish mayors vallavanem.
 Witan in Anglo-Saxon and other Germanic traditions was a wise man although usually just a noble. The term is most often used to describe those who attended the Witenagemot.

See also
 Big man (anthropology)
 Religious elder
 Sheikh
 Village head

References

Further reading
Bolen, Jean Shinoda Crones Don't Whine. Conari Press. Boston. 2003.
Gutmann, David. Reclaimed Powers. Northwestern U. Press. Evanston, Ill.1994
Dass, Ram. Still Here.Embracing Aging, Changing, and Dying .Riverhead Books.New York. 2001.
Jones, Terry. Elder: A spiritual alternative to being elderly. Elderhood Institute. 2006.
Jones, Terry. The Elder Within: Source of Mature Masculinity. Elderhood Institute. 2001.
Leder, Drew. Spiritual Passages. Jeremy P. Tarcher/Putnam. New York. 1997.
Levinson, Daniel J. The Seasons of a Man's Life. Ballantine Books. NY. 1978.
Raines, Robert. A Time to Live. Seven Steps in Creative Aging. A Plume Book. New York. 1997.
Schachter-Shalomi, Zalman. Ageing to Sageing. Warner Books. N.Y. 1995.

Titles
Political anthropology